Fitzgerald High School College and Career Academy (FHSCCA) is the local high school in Fitzgerald, Georgia, United States. A part of the Ben Hill County School District, it serves students in grades 9-12.  its principal is James Sirmans. Fitzgerald High School is currently involved in the Title I Plan.

Athletics
Fitzgerald High School College and Career Academy competes in the Class AA division of the Georgia High School Association in football, cross country (boys' and girls'), softball, competitive cheerleading, basketball (boys' and girls'), wrestling, riflery, baseball, track (boys' and girls'), soccer (boys' and girls'), tennis (boys' and girls'), competitive weightlifting, and golf (boys' and girls'). Sports teams are known as the Fitzgerald Purple Hurricanes, or simply the Canes. The Purple Hurricane Athletic Department also fields football cheerleading and basketball cheerleading squads.

The Fitzgerald Purple Hurricane Athletic Department won the Georgia Athletic Director Association's Region Director's Cup for the 2015-2016 school year. The Purple Hurricanes compete in Region 1-AA.

Past accomplishments

FHSCCA has won four state championship weightlifting titles.

The FHSCCA competition cheer team won a cheerleading state championship in 2005. The "Purple Girls" have won 15 consecutive region titles.

The Fitzgerald Purple Hurricane men's track team won four consecutive state titles (1988, 1989, 1990, and 1991). In 2015, the FHS men's track team finished as the state runner-up.

References 

Schools in Ben Hill County, Georgia
Public high schools in Georgia (U.S. state)